Luo Shigao (1905–1995) was a Chinese diplomat. He was born in Dabu County, Guangdong Province. After the founding of the People's Republic of China, he was made deputy mayor of Chongqing. He served as China's 2nd Ambassador to Albania from 1957 to 1964.

References
重庆市地方志编纂委员会, 重庆办公厅. 《重庆年鉴》. 科学技术文献出版社重庆分社. 1987年: 18页.
1905 births
1995 deaths
Ambassadors of China to Albania
People from Dabu
People's Republic of China politicians from Guangdong
Political office-holders in Chongqing
Politicians from Meizhou